Lofi hip hop (also known as chillhop and lofi beats to study to) is a form of downtempo music that combines elements of hip hop and chill-out music. It was popularized in the 2010s on YouTube.

Origins

Lo-fi hip-hop originated within the underground beatmaking hip-hop scene of the 2000s, particularly after the advent of Roland SP-303 and Roland SP-404 samplers, each of which featured the "lo-fi" effect as a separate button. Vice contributor Luke Winkie suggested that "if there is one shared touchstone for lo-fi hip-hop, it's probably [the 2004 MF Doom and Madlib album] Madvillainy". 

The Japanese artist Nujabes, often called the "godfather of lofi hip hop", is also credited with driving lofi's growth with his contributions to the soundtrack for the popular anime Samurai Champloo. Another artist also often associated with the development of lofi is US rapper and producer J Dilla.

Emergence and popularity
In 2013, YouTube began hosting live streams, which resulted in 24-hour "radio stations" dedicated to microgenres such as vaporwave. Compilation videos are also popular, combining the music with visuals that could take the form of recorded pedestrian walks through major cities like Tokyo, looping visuals from cartoons such as The Simpsons or Internet memes. Spotify added to the popular "lo-fi beats" wave by generating "Spotified genres", including "Chill Hits", "Bedroom Pop" playlists, and promoting numerous "chill pop" artists.

In 2017, a form of downtempo music tagged as "chillhop" or "lo-fi hip hop" became popular among YouTube music streamers. Most, if not all, of the content used in YouTube videos was primarily published on SoundCloud. By 2018, several of these channels had millions of followers. One DJ, Ryan Celsius, theorized that they were inspired by a nostalgia for the commercial bumpers used by Toonami and Adult Swim in the 2000s, and that this "created a cross section of people that enjoyed both anime and wavy hip-hop beats". These channels equally functioned as chatrooms, with participants often discussing their personal struggles. By 2018, Spotify's "Chill Hits" playlist had 5.4 million listeners and had been growing rapidly.

Winkie credited YouTube user Lofi Girl (formerly known as "ChilledCow") as "the person who first featured a studious anime girl as his calling card, which set up the aesthetic framework for the rest of the people operating in the genre".

Viewership of lo-fi hip hop streams grew significantly during the COVID-19 pandemic. In April 2020, MTV News noted, "there might be something to be said for lo-fi hip-hop's composition, and the way its creators mix simplistic melodies with a judicious use of words to create intense memories, feelings, and nostalgia" and stated that the quarantine in place in various countries "has led people to log more hours online due to boredom or virtual workplaces and schools, and livestreamed music performances are reaching their full potential".

See also 
Smooth jazz
Quiet storm
Boom bap

References 

21st-century music genres
2000s in music
2010s in music
2020s in music
Microgenres
Lo-fi music
Internet memes introduced in 2017